Curuapira is a genus of longhorn beetles of the subfamily Lamiinae, containing the following species:

 Curuapira apyama Martins & Galileo, 2005
 Curuapira exotica Martins & Galileo, 1998
 Curuapira tuberosa Galileo & Martins, 2003

References

Desmiphorini